The Monte Vista and Diamond Mountain Vineyard, at 2121 Diamond Mountain Rd. in Calistoga, California, was listed on the National Register of Historic Places in 2013.  The listing included five contributing buildings and a contributing site.

It is a six building farm complex and a vineyard.

The property, then a  area on the eastern slope of Diamond Mountain, was purchased by Andrew Rasmussen, an immigrant from Denmark,  from George W. Briggs in 1895. Ramussen commissioned the building of a farmhouse, carriage house and barn by a John Bradbury.

It was a single family farm until Prohibition began in 1920.

References

National Register of Historic Places in Napa County, California
Buildings and structures completed in 1896